Bob Kersee (born in the Canal Zone, Panama) is an American track coach. He was the coach and husband of Olympic gold medallist Jackie Joyner-Kersee.

Career
He is a graduate of San Pedro High School, Los Angeles Harbor College where he was a state finalist in the hurdles, Long Beach State University (B.A. Physical Education 1978) and California State University, Northridge (Masters in Exercise Physiology).  While at Northridge, he coached their track team.  In 1980 he moved to the University of California, Los Angeles, where he was an assistant coach for four years.  He then became the head coach and established his reputation for training elite level athletes.  Many of those athletes have themselves become elite level coaches.

In 2005 he was selected USATF Coach of the year.

In 1989, sprinter Angela Bailey stated that she did not want to train with Kersee due to suspicions about performance-enhancing drugs.

Athletes trained by Bob Kersee

 Andrea Anderson
 Jerome Bettis
 Jeanette Bolden
 Valerie Brisco-Hooks
 Kori Carter
 Kerron Clement
 Ginnie Crawford (née Powell)
 Shawn Crawford
 Gail Devers
 Chloe Abbott
 Allyson Felix
 Greg Foster
 Florence Griffith Joyner
 Joanna Hayes
 Dawn Harper
 Natasha Hastings
 Sherri Howard
 Jackie Joyner-Kersee
 Ty Law
Nicole Leach
 Sydney McLaughlin
 Brandon Miller
 Athing Mu
 Jenna Prandini
 Keni Harrison
 Morolake Akinosun
 Sha-ri Pendleton
 Michelle Perry
 Andre Phillips

References

External links
 UCLA profile

Year of birth missing (living people)
Living people
American track and field coaches
California State University, Long Beach alumni
Cal State Northridge Matadors track and field coaches
Long Beach State Beach men's track and field athletes
UCLA Bruins track and field coaches
Sports coaches from California
Track and field people from California